Rath/Heumar is a quarter of Cologne, Germany. It is located in the eastern part of the city, in the borough (Stadtbezirk) of Kalk.

Its population on 31 December 2004, was approximately 11,000.

Location 

Rath/Heumar lies on the eastern edge of Cologne, bordering on its eastern side the Königsforst recreation park . To the east are the municipalities of Bergisch Gladbach and Rösrath, to the south Cologne-Eil, to the west Cologne-Gremberghoven and Cologne-Ostheim, to the north-west Cologne-Neubrück and to the north Cologne-Brück. Housing density is lower than in more central parts of the town, and many of the residential zones are dominated by detached family houses.  

Boroughs and quarters of Cologne
Kalk, Cologne